Cyperus chorisanthus is a species of sedge that is native to parts of Central America and Mexico.

See also 
 List of Cyperus species

References 

chorisanthus
Plants described in 1908
Flora of Nicaragua
Flora of Panama
Flora of Costa Rica
Flora of Mexico
Taxa named by Charles Baron Clarke